The Irish Gambit, Chicago Gambit, or Razzle Dazzle Gambit is a weak chess opening that begins:

1. e4 e5
2. Nf3 Nc6
3. Nxe5?

intending 3...Nxe5 4.d4.

Discussion
The gambit is accordingly considered unsound, and is almost never seen in high-level play. It is often referred to as the Chicago Gambit, perhaps because Harold Meyer Phillips, remarkably, used it in an 1899 game in a simultaneous exhibition in Chicago to beat Harry Nelson Pillsbury, one of the strongest players in the world at the time.

An apocryphal tale is told of the anonymous inventor of the gambit.  On his deathbed, when asked what subtle idea lay behind the gambit, his last words were reportedly: "I hadn't seen the king's pawn was defended."

A similar line is the Halloween Gambit, 1.e4 e5 2.Nf3 Nc6 3.Nc3 Nf6 4.Nxe5 It is also considered dubious, but is sounder than the Irish Gambit, because White can gain  by chasing both of Black's knights while occupying the center. White has won a number of short games with the Halloween Gambit.

See also
 List of chess openings
 List of chess openings named after places

References

Bibliography
 

Chess openings
1899 in chess